This is a list of former high school athletic conferences in the Northeast Region of Ohio, as designated by the OHSAA. If a conference had members that span multiple regions, the conference is placed in the article of the region most of its former members hail from. Because the names of localities and their corresponding high schools do not always match and because there is often a possibility of ambiguity with respect to either the name of a locality or the name of a high school, the following table gives both in every case, with the locality name first, in plain type, and the high school name second in boldface type. The school's team nickname is given last.

All-American Athletic Conference
This short-lived conference began when Hubbard left the Mahoning Valley Conference to join with four defectors from the Steel Valley Conference (leaving the SVC in a weakened state, with only four schools remaining). When Western Reserve closed in 1990, Hubbard and Warren Harding rejoined their former conferences, while Howland and Niles McKinley followed Hubbard into the MVC.

 Warren Harding Panthers (1986–90, to Steel Valley)
 Howland Tigers (1986–90, to Mahoning Valley)
 Hubbard Eagles (1986–90, to Mahoning Valley)
 Niles McKinley Dragons (1986–90, to Mahoning Valley)
 Warren Western Reserve Raiders (1986–90, consolidated into Warren Harding)

All-American Conference (Football)
This football-only conference featured six schools in northeastern Ohio, with some of the strongest gridiron teams in the state. Some of the schools also competed in the Ohio Big 8 League for other sports. The league lasted 16 seasons, and broke up primarily because of the dominance of Massillon Washington.

 Warren Harding Panthers (1963–79)
 Canton McKinley Bulldogs (1963–79)
 Niles McKinley Red Dragons (1963–79)
 Massillon Washington Tigers (1963–79)
 Steubenville Big Red (1966–79)
 Alliance Aviators (1969–79)

All-Ohio Conference/League
The league began as the AOC in 1976, as the Chippewa Conference split into this league and the Pioneer League. After Coventry replaced Tuscarawas Valley in 1983, the name was changed to the AOL.
 Navarre Fairless Falcons (1976–89, to PAC-7)
 Canal Fulton Northwest Indians (1977–89, to Northeastern Buckeye)
 Orrville Red Riders (1976–1989, to Ohio Heartland Conference 1999–2003)
 Wooster Triway Titans (1976–1989, to Mohican Area)
 Millersburg West Holmes Knights (1976–1989, to Mohican Area)
 Zoarville Tuscarawas Valley Trojans (1977-1983)
 Manchester Panthers (1976–89, to PAC-7)
 Coventry Comets (1983–89, to PAC-7)

Ashland County League
see Ashland County HS Sports Teams, Ohio
 Albion Britons (colors: Navy & wine) (1929–38, consolidated into Homerville)
 Hayesville Panthers (colors: orange & black) (1929–63, consolidated into Hillsdale)
 Jeromesville Blue Jays (colors: blue & white) (1929–63, consolidated into Hillsdale)
 Loudonville Redbirds (colors: scarlet & gray) (1929–62, moved to Johnny Appleseed Conference)
 Nankin Knights (1929–37, consolidated into Polk)
 Nova Trojans (colors: orange) (1929–49, consolidated into Ruggles-Troy)
 Perrysville Admirals (colors: red & white) (1929–61, consolidated into Loudonville)
 Polk Presidents (colors: orange & black) (1929–63, consolidated into Mapleton)
 Ruggles Redskins (colors: crimson & royal blue) (1929–49, consolidated into Ruggles-Troy)
 Savannah Sailors (colors: green & white) (1929–62, consolidated into Crestview)
 Sullivan Bobcats (colors: red & white) (1929–58, consolidated into Black River)
 Ruggles-Troy Golden Flashes (colors: green & gold) (1949–63, consolidated into Mapleton)
 Sullivan Black River Pirates (1958–63, moved to Firelands)

Chippewa Conference
 Brunswick Blue Devils (1963–77, to Pioneer)
 Lodi Cloverleaf Colts (1963–77, to Pioneer)
 Orrville Red Riders (1963–1976, to All-Ohio)
 Wadsworth Grizzlies (1963–77, to Pioneer)
 Millersburg West Holmes Knights (1968-1976, to All-Ohio)
 Wooster Triway Titans (1970–1976, to All-Ohio)

The larger schools with proximity to I-76, I-71 and I-271 (Brunswick, Cloverleaf and Wadsworth) merged with Brecksville, North Royalton and Strongsville as charter members of the Pioneer Conference.   Those three Cuyahoga County Conference schools also experienced greater enrollment increases than the smaller schools in their conference.  They also had proximity to I-71, as well as the newly constructed I-271. Although Highland is often mentioned in association with the league, it was never in the conference.  They played in the Inland Conference (1958-1976) before joining the Suburban League in 1977.  Many Chippewa Conference schools included Highland in their non-conference schedules among several sports.

Crown Conference
(1967-1980)
 Bedford St. Peter Chanel Firebirds (Closed)
 Cleveland Cathedral Latin Lions (Now Notre Dame - Cathedral Latin)
 Cleveland St. Joseph Vikings (Now Villa Angela-St. Joseph)
 Lakewood St. Edward Eagles
 Mentor Lake Catholic Cougars
 Parma Padua Franciscan Bruins
 Parma Heights Holy Name Green Wave

Cuyahoga County Conference/League
The initial CCL split into the Eastern Cuyahoga County League and West Side Cuyahoga County League (later the East and West County Leagues) in 1929. Various defections from within the county led to a short reformation of the league in 1954. The East and West leagues were revived two years later. Further defections to other leagues led to neither league being stable, and they revived the county league (now under the CCC banner) in 1964.

First Version (192?-29)

"A" League
 Berea Braves (192?-29)
 Lyndhurst Brush Arcs (192?-29)
 Cleveland Heights Tigers (192?-28)
 Euclid Panthers (192?-29)
 Garfield Heights Bulldogs (192?-29)
 Independence Blue Devils (192?-29)
 Maple Heights Mustangs (192?-29)
 Rocky River Pirates (192?-27)
 Parma Schaar Redmen (192?-29)
 East Cleveland Shaw Cardinals (192?-28)
 Mayfield Wildcats (1927–29)

"B" League
 Bay Village Bay Rockets (192?-29)
 Beachwood Bison (192?-29)
 Broadview Heights Brecksville-Broadview Heights Bees (192?-29)
 Brooklyn Hurricanes (192?-29)
 Chagrin Falls Tigers (192?-29)
 Cuyahoga Heights Redskins (192?-29)
 Fairview Park Fairview Warriors (192?-29)
 Mayfield Wildcats (192?-27, to "A" League)
 North Olmstead Eagles (192?-29)
 North Royalton Bears (192?-29)
 Olmsted Falls Bulldogs (192?-29)
 Pepper Pike Orange Lions (192?-29)
 Richmond Heights Spartans (192?-29)
 Solon  Comets (192?-29)
 Strongsville Mustangs (192?-29)
 Warrensville Heights Tigers (192?-29)
 Westlake Demons (192?-29)

Second Version (1954–56)
 Beachwood Bison (1954–56)
 Broadview Heights Brecksville-Broadview Heights Bees (1954-1956)
 Brooklyn Hurricanes (1954-1956)
 Lyndhurst Brush Arcs (1954–56)
 Chagrin Falls Tigers (1954–56)
 Cuyahoga Heights Redskins (1954-1956)
 Independence Blue Devils (1954-1956)
 Mayfield Wildcats (1954–56)
 North Royalton Bears (1954-1956)
 Pepper Pike Orange Lions (1954–56)
 Richmond Heights Spartans (1954-1956)
 Solon  Comets (1954–56)
 Strongsville Mustangs (1954-1956)
 Warrensville Heights Tigers (1954-1956)

Third Version (1964–79)
 Broadview Heights Brecksville-Broadview Heights Bees (1964-1977)
 Brooklyn Hurricanes (1964-1979)
 Cuyahoga Heights Redskins (1964-1979)
 Independence Blue Devils (1964-1979)
 North Royalton Bears (1964-1977)
 Richmond Heights Spartans (1964-1968)
 Strongsville Mustangs (1964-1977)
 Warrensville Heights Tigers (1964-1979)
 Rocky River Lutheran West Longhorns (1968-1970)

The three larger schools in this conference (Brecksville, North Royalton and Strongsville) experienced greater enrollment increases, were closer to I-71 and I-271 and merged with Chippewa Conference schools sharing similar characteristics (Brunswick, Cloverleaf and Wadsworth) to comprise the charter members of the Pioneer Conference (launched in 1977).  Warrensville Heights was also growing in enrollment and joined another Cleveland area league with schools closer in size.  Smaller schools like Brooklyn, Cuyahoga Heights, Independence and Lutheran West later joined the Inland Conference.  The three public schools were limited in potential enrollment increase because their city limits were no longer expandable.  They were also near I-480, making travel among their new Inland Conference opponents easier, and their competition consisted of schools similar in enrollment.  Richmond Heights had the same city limit growth issues and left for the East Suburban Conference early on.

East Suburban Conference

 Beachwood Bison (1968–89, to MAC-8)
 Burton Berkshire Badgers (1968–96, to Chagrin Valley Conference (CVC))
 Middlefield Cardinal Huskies (1968–96, to CVC)
 Kirtland Hornets (1968–96, to CVC)
 Newbury Black Knights (1968–98, to CVC)
 Richmond Heights Spartans (1968–89, to MAC-8)
 Fairport Harbor Harding Skippers (1970–76 (to Grand River), 1989-2005 (to CVC))
 Chardon Hilltoppers (1980–83, to CVC)
 Aurora Greenmen (1983–89, to MAC-8)
 Perry Pirates (1984–96, to CVC)
 Thompson Ledgemont Redskins (1989-2009, to Northeastern Athletic (NAC))
 Orwell Grand Valley Mustangs (1989–98, to CVC)
 Vienna Mathews Mustangs (1989–91 (to Inter-County), football only 2004–09 (to NAC))
 Andover Pymatuning Valley Lakers (1989–98 (to Northeastern), football only 2004-2009 (to NAC))
 Bristolville Bristol Panthers (1992-2002 (No Football), to NAC)
 North Bloomfield Bloomfield Cardinals (1996-2002 (No Football), to NAC)
 Southington Chalker Wildcats (1996-2002 (Football 1996–2009), to NAC)
 Lordstown Red Devils (1996-2002 (No Football), to NAC)
 Cortland Maplewood Rockets (1996-2002 (No Football), to NAC)
 Ashtabula Sts. John & Paul Fighting Heralds (1996-2009)
 Cuyahoga Falls Cuyahoga Valley Christian Academy Royals (1998-2001, to Principals)
 Cleveland Heights Lutheran East Falcons (1998-2009, to NAC (football-only))
 Cleveland Central Catholic Ironmen (football only 2004–06, to North Coast)
 Youngstown Christian Eagles (2005–09, to North Coast 2015)

Erie Coast Conference
(1977–1986)
 Elyria Catholic Panthers (1977–1986)
 Elyria West Wolverines (1977-1986)
 Lorain Catholic Spartans (1977-1986)
 Lorain Southview Saints (1977–1986)

Erie Shore Conference
(1987–1997)
 Lorain Admiral King Admirals (1987–1997)
 Elyria Pioneers (1987–1997)
 Lorain Steelmen (1987–1995, closed 1995)
 Grafton Midview Middies (1987–1996)
 North Ridgeville Rangers (1987–1997)
 Sandusky Blue Streaks (1987–1997)
 Lorain Southview Saints (1987–1997)
 Vermilion Sailors (1987–1997)

Freeway Conference
(1962-1968)
The Freeway Conference was formed in 1962 by six programs from the eastern suburbs of Cleveland: five from Lake County, all of which joined from the Northeastern Conference, and one from Cuyahoga County. The differing growth patterns of these suburbs caused the quick demise of the league, as the three growing programs all left to join the original Greater Cleveland Conference in 1968, replacing Garfield Heights.
 Mayfield Wildcats (1962-1968, to Greater Cleveland)
 Mentor Cardinals (1962-1968, to Greater Cleveland)
 Painesville Harvey Red Raiders (1962-1968)
 Painesville Riverside Beavers (1962-1968)
 Wickliffe Blue Devils (1962-1968)
 Willoughby South Rebels (1962-1968, to Greater Cleveland)

Grand River Conference
 Orwell Grand Valley Mustangs (1972–89, to East Suburban)
 Thompson Ledgemont Redskins (1972–89, to East Suburban)
 Perry Pirates (1972–84, to East Suburban)
 Andover Pymatuning Valley Lakers (1972–89, to East Suburban)
 Jefferson Falcons (1974–87, to Northeastern)
 Fairport Harbor Harding Skippers (1976–89, to East Suburban)
 Southington Chalker Wildcats (1978–82, 1987-89 (football only))
 Vienna Mathews Mustangs (1985-89 (football only, to East Suburban))

Hall of Fame Conference
(football only, 1972–1975)
Louisville St. Thomas Aquinas Knights
Canton Central Catholic Crusaders
Canton Lehman Polar Bears
Canton Lincoln Lions
Canton Timken Trojans

Inland Conference
The Inland Conference formed in 1957 with 8 members.  Brookside left in 1970 and was replaced by Lutheran West.  Highland left in 1976 and was eventually replaced by Independence.  Brooklyn and Cuyahoga Heights joined in 1979/1980 and the league was divided into an East Division (Brooklyn, Buckeye, Cuyahoga Heights, Independence, Lutheran West) and a West Division (Avon, Columbia, Firelands, Keystone, South Amherst).  Season ending conference championship games in most sports were played between the winners of each division, to crown the overall conference champion.  Avon, Firelands and Keystone left at the end of the 1985–86 school year and began play in the newly formed Lorain County Conference in the Fall of 1986.  The remaining Inland Conference schools returned to the one division format, until the league dissolved at the end of the 1988–89 school year, one year after South Amherst was absorbed by Firelands.  All remaining members, except Buckeye, joined the newly formed Metropolitan Athletic Conference in the Fall of 1989.

 Avon Eagles (1957–1986) -- Left after Spring 1986 to join the Lorain County Conference
 Sheffield Brookside Cardinals (1957–1970) -- Left after Spring of 1970 to join the Lakeland Conference
 Medina Buckeye Bucks (1957–1989) -- Became an independent when the Inland Conference dissolved
 Columbia Station Columbia Raiders (1957–1989) -- Joined the Metropolitan Athletic Conference in Fall of 1989
 Oberlin Firelands Falcons (1957–1986) --  Left after Spring 1986 to join the Lorain County Conference
 Medina Highland Hornets (1957–1976) -- Left after Spring of 1976 to join the Suburban League
 LaGrange Keystone Wildcats (1957–1986) -- Left after Spring 1986 to join the Lorain County Conference
 South Amherst Cavaliers (1957–1988) -- Merged with Firelands in 1988
 Rocky River Lutheran West Longhorns (1970–1989) -- Joined the Metropolitan Athletic Conference in Fall of 1989
 Cuyahoga Heights Redskins (1979-1989) -- Joined the Metropolitan Athletic Conference in Fall of 1989
 Brooklyn Hurricanes (1979–1989) -- Joined the Metropolitan Athletic Conference in Fall of 1989
 Independence Blue Devils (1979–1989) -- Joined the Metropolitan Athletic Conference in Fall of 1989

Source:

Inter-County League
This is one of the far East Ohio leagues that merged to for the Inter-Tri-County League, along with the Tri-County League, in 2006. Both leagues had members move between the two leagues quite a bit, with Columbiana having spent multiple stints in both leagues.

 Canfield Cardinals (1951–60, to Turnpike Conference)
 Columbiana Clippers (1951–56, to Tri-County League, 1976–91, to Tri-County League)
 Damascus Goshen Union Gophers (1951–59, consolidated into West Branch)
 Lowellville Rockets (1951-2006, to ITCL)
 McDonald Blue Devils (1951-2006, to ITCL)
 North Lima Zippers (1951–69, consolidated into South Range)
 New Middletown Springfield Tigers (1951–60, to Turnpike Conference, 1969–2006, to ITCL)
 North Jackson Jackson-Milton Blue Jays (1954–60, to Turnpike Conference, 1967–2006, to ITCL)
 Greenford Bobcats (1956–69, consolidated into South Range)
 Columbiana Crestview Rebels (1957–74, to Tri-County League)
 Berlin Center Western Reserve Blue Devils (1959-2006, to ITCL)
 Mineral Ridge Rams (1961-2006, to ITCL)
 North Lima South Range Raiders (1969-2006, to ITCL)
 Vienna Mathews Mustangs (1991-2003, to Northeastern Athletic Conference; 2004 football only)
 Sebring McKinley Trojans (2005–06, to ITCL)

Inter-Tri County League
The ITCL was formed as a merger of the Inter-County and Tri-County leagues in 2006. The two-tier system was realigned into a three-tier system in 2015 to reduce travel costs. In March 2016, it was announced that the league would disband into two leagues, the Mahoning Valley Athletic Conference and the Eastern Ohio Athletic Conference, effective for the 2017-18 year.

Blue Division
 North Jackson Jackson-Milton Blue Jays (2006-2017, to MVAC) 
 Lowellville Rockets (2006-2017, to MVAC)
 McDonald Blue Devils (2006-2017, to MVAC)
 Sebring McKinley Trojans (2006-2017, to MVAC) 
 Mineral Ridge Rams (2006-2017, to MVAC)
 Berlin Center Western Reserve Blue Devils (2006-2017, to MVAC)

Red Division 
 Columbiana Crestview Rebels (2006-2017, to Ohio Valley Athletic Conference)
 East Palestine Bulldogs (2006-2017, to EOAC)
 Canfield/North Lima South Range Raiders (2006-2017, to Independent, to Northeast-8 Conference 2019.) 
 New Middletown Springfield Tigers (2006-2017, to MVAC)
 Hanoverton United Golden Eagles (2006-2017, to EOAC)

White Division 
 Lisbon David Anderson Blue Devils (2006-2017, to EOAC)
 Columbiana Clippers (2006-2017, to EOAC) 
 Leetonia Bears (2006-2017, to EOAC) 
 Salineville Southern Local Indians (2006-2017, to EOAC) 
 Wellsville Tigers (2006-2017, to EOAC)

Divisions 2006-15

Note: Columbiana and Jackson-Milton were switched for the 2012 season.

Lakeland Conference
(1953–86)
 Lorain Clearview Clippers (1953–1986)
 Huron Tigers (1953–1968)
 Castalia Margaretta Polar Bears (1953–1961)
 New London Wildcats (1953–1970)
 Vermilion Sailors (1953–1986)
 Wellington Dukes (1953–1986)
 Amherst Marion L. Steele Comets (Amherst until 1958, 1954–1986)
 Avon Lake Shoremen (1961–1964)
 Grafton Midview Middies (1961–1986)
 North Ridgeville Rangers (1961–1986)
 Oberlin Indians (1964–1986)
 Sheffield Brookside Cardinals (1970–1986)

Lorain County League/Conference
Originally began in 1924 as one of the small-school county leagues, the league survived the consolidation wave until 1961, when the schools who weren't already aligned with the Inland Conference joined the Lakeland Conference. The conference revived itself in 1986, as the Lakeland collapsed, and the schools banded together for roughly two decades until the schools split, this time to help form the Patriot Athletic and West Shore conferences.

Third Version (Lorain County League, 2019-)
 Sullivan Black River Pirates (2019-)
 Sheffield Brookside Cardinals (2019-)
 Lorain Clearview Clippers (2019-)
 Columbia Station Columbia Raiders1 (2019-)
 Oberlin Firelands Falcons (2019-)
 LaGrange Keystone Wildcats (2019-)
 Oberlin Phoenix (2019-)
 Wellington Dukes (2019-)

Second Version (Lorain County Conference, 1986–2005)
 Avon Eagles (1986–2005, to West Shore)
 Sheffield Brookside Cardinals (1986–2005, to Patriot)
 Lorain Clearview Clippers (1986–2005, to Patriot)
 Oberlin Firelands Falcons (1986–2005, to West Shore)
 LaGrange Keystone Wildcats (1986–2005, to Patriot)
 Oberlin Phoenix (1986–2005, to Patriot)
 Wellington Dukes (1986–2005, to Patriot)
 Elyria West Wolverines (1986–1996, school closed, consolidated into Elyria)
 Grafton Midview Middies (1996–2005, to West SHore)

First Version (Lorain County League, 1924–61)
 Avon Eagles1 (1924–61, to Inland)
 Avon Lake Shoremen (1924–1961, to Lakeland)
 Belden Bees (1924–55, consolidated into Midview)
 Brighton Bears (1924–52, consolidated into Wellington)
 Sheffield Brookside Cardinals1 (1924–61, to Inland)
 Brownhelm Bombers (1924–52, consolidated into Firelands)
 Kipton Camden Knights (1924–52, consolidated into Firelands)
 Columbia Station Columbia Raiders1 (1924–61, to Inland)
 Grafton Eaton Eels (1924–55, consolidated into Midview)
 Grafton Comets (1924–55, consolidated into Midview)
 Henrietta Hawks (1924–52, consolidated into Firelands)
 LaGrange Wildcats (1924–59, consolidated into Keystone)
 North Ridgeville Rangers (1924–27, to NOAL, 1933–61, to Lakeland)
 Penfield Bombers (1924–59, consolidated into Keystone)
 South Amherst Cavaliers1 (1924–61, to Inland)
 Wellington Dukes (1924–27, to NOAL)
 Lorain Clearview Clippers (1928–38, to NOAL, 1947–53, to Lakeland)
 Oberlin Firelands Falcons1 (1952–61, to Inland)
 Grafton Midview Middies (1955–61, to Lakeland)
 Lagrange Keystone Wildcats2 (1959–61)

 Concurrent with Inland Conference 1957–61.
 Concurrent with Inland Conference 1959–61.

Division Alignments

Mahoning Valley Conference/Metro Athletic Conference
The MVC began in 1972, and changed its name to the MAC in 1994. In 2008 the league (minus East Liverpool) merged with the Trumbull Athletic Conference to become the All-American Conference.

 Canfield Cardinals (1972-2008)
 Girard Indians (1972-2000)
 Warren John F. Kennedy Eagles (1972–94)
 Liberty Leopards (1972-1979)
 Poland Poland Seminary Bulldogs (1972-2008)
 Salem Quakers (1978-2008)
 Struthers Wildcats (1979-2008)
 Beloit West Branch Warriors (1972-1981)
 Campbell Memorial Red Devils (1980–94, 2006–08)
 Howland Tigers (1972-1975, 1994-2008 (Football 1995–2008))
 Niles McKinley Dragons (1994-2008 (Football 1995–2008))
 Alliance Aviators (2003–05)
 East Liverpool Potters (2006–08)

Metro League
(1937-1996)
 Coventry Comets (1937–69, to Suburban)
 Akron Ellet Orangemen (1937–71, to Akron City)
 Lakemore Springfield Spartans (1937–93, to Northeastern Buckeye)
 Kent State Blue Devils (1937–45, 1950–53, to Portage County)
 Stow-Munroe Falls Bulldogs (1937–96, merged into Western Reserve)
 Norton Panthers (1940–72, to Suburban)
 North Canton Vikings (1945–52, to Stark County A)
 Tallmadge Blue Devils (1949–90, to Suburban)
 Wadsworth Grizzlies (1954–63, to Chippewa)
 Kent Roosevelt Rough Riders (1954–96, merged into Western Reserve)
 Ravenna Ravens (1963–96, merged into Western Reserve)
 Macedonia Nordonia Knights (1973–94, to Greater Cleveland)
 Brimfield Field Falcons (1976–78, to Suburban)
 Cuyahoga Falls Black Tigers (1978–96, merged into Western Reserve)
 Barberton Magics (1988–96, merged into Western Reserve)

Metropolitan Area Conference (MAC-8)
(1989-2005)
 Aurora Greenmen (1989–96, to Chagrin Valley Conference)
 Beachwood Bison (1989-2005, to Chagrin Valley Conference)
 Brooklyn Hurricanes (1989-2005, to Patriot Athletic Conference)
 Columbia Station Columbia Raiders (1989-2005, to Patriot Athletic Conference)
 Cuyahoga Heights Redskins (1989-2005, to Chagrin Valley Conference)
 Independence Blue Devils (1989-2005, to Chagrin Valley Conference)
 Rocky River Lutheran West Longhorns (1989-2005, to Patriot Athletic Conference)
 Richmond Heights Spartans (1989-2005, to Chagrin Valley Conference)
 Gates Mills Gilmour Academy Lancers (1996-2005)

Mohican Area Conference
 Bellville Clear Fork Colts (1989–2004, to Ohio Cardinal)
 Loudonville Redbirds (1989–2004, to Mid-Buckeye)
 Millersburg West Holmes Knights (1989–2003, to Ohio Cardinals)
 Wooster Triway Titans (1989–2004, to Principals')
 Medina Buckeye Bucks (1993–2004, to Patriot 2005)
 Sullivan Black River Pirates (1993–2004, to Patriot 2005)

North Central Conference (Cleveland area)
 Bedford St. Peter Chanel Firebirds (1974-1983)
 Cleveland Central Catholic Ironmen (1968-1983)
 Cleveland Our Lady of Lourdes Crusaders (?-1968, consolidated into Cleveland Central Catholic)*
 Cleveland St. John Cantius Jayhawks (?-1968, consolidated into Cleveland Central Catholic)*
 Cleveland St. Stanislaus Panthers (?-1968, consolidated into Cleveland Central Catholic)*
 Elyria Catholic Panthers
 Gates Mills Gilmour Academy Lancers
 Garfield Heights Trinity Trojans (1977-1983)
 Lorain St. Mary's Fighting Irish
 Lorain Catholic Spartans
 Mentor Lake Catholic Cougars (1972-1977)
 Parma Byzantine Catholic Buccaneers (closed 1975)
 Warrensville Heights Tigers (1979-1983)
Note: Our Lady of Lourdes, St. John Cantius and St. Stanislaus High Schools merged with Cleveland St. Michael in 1968 to form Cleveland Central Catholic.

North Coast League

Blue Division
 Akron Archbishop Hoban Knights (2005-2020)
 Cleveland Heights Beaumont Bluestreaks (girls' only, 2011–2020)
 Cleveland Benedictine Bengals (boys' only, 2011–2020)
 Mentor Lake Catholic Cougars (1984-2020)
 Chardon Notre Dame-Cathedral Latin Lions (1988-2020, [Football, 1991-2020])
 Parma Padua Franciscan Bruins (1984-2020) 
 Cuyahoga Falls Walsh Jesuit Warriors (2011-2020)
 Cleveland St. Joseph Academy Jaguars (girls' only, 2018–2020)
White Division
 Cleveland Central Catholic Ironmen (1984-2004, 2006–2020)
 Gates Mills Gilmour Academy Lancers (2018-2020)
 Warren John F. Kennedy Eagles (2011-2020) 
 Cleveland Villa Angela-St. Joseph Vikings (2004-2020)

Former members
 Bedford St. Peter Chanel Firebirds (1984-2013, school closed)
 Parma Heights Holy Name Green Wave (1984-2015)
 Elyria Catholic Panthers (1985-2011, [Football 1995-2011])
 Youngstown Valley Christian Eagles (2015-2017)
 Garfield Heights Trinity Trojans (1984-2019)
 Louisville St. Thomas Aquinas Knights (2013-2019)

Northeastern Conference
Ashtabula City Panthers (1951-2001, consolidated into Lakeside)
 Fairport Harbor Fairport Harding Skippers (1951-1962)
Geneva Eagles (1951-2009, to Premier 2011)
 Painesville Harvey Red Raiders (1951-1962, to Freeway; 1987–2009, to Chagrin Valley-Chagrin)
 Mentor Cardinals (1951-1962, to Freeway)
 Painesville Riverside Beavers (1951-1962, to Freeway; 1976–1998, to Premier)
 Wickliffe Blue Devils (1957-1962, to Freeway)
 Conneaut Spartans (1958-2009, to PIAA-District 10 2016)
 Willoughby South Rebels (1960-1962, to Freeway)
 Ashtabula St. John Heralds (1962-1996, to East Suburban 1998)
 Ashtabula Edgewood Warriors (1965-2009, to All-American 2011)
 Ashtabula Harbor Mariners (1965-2001, consolidated into Lakeside)
 Jefferson Falcons (1968-1973, 1987–2009, to All-American 2014)
 Andover Pymatuning Valley Lakers (1968-1973, to Grand River; 1998–2002, to Northeastern Athletic)
Madison Blue Streaks (1972-1998, to Premier)
 Ashtabula Lakeside Dragons (2001-2007, to Premier)

Northeast Ohio Conference
The Northeast Ohio Conference name was used by two different conferences, one in the 1970s and the other from 2007 to 2015.

Second Version (2007–15)

The conference was formed in 2007 by the merger of the Pioneer Conference and a previous incarnation of the Western Reserve conference. There are three six-member divisions — Valley, River and Lake — that vary by sport.
Brunswick Blue Devils (2007–15, to Greater Cleveland Conference)
Lyndhurst Brush Arcs (2007–15, to Western Reserve Conference)
Cuyahoga Falls Black Tigers (2007–15, to Suburban League)
Elyria Pioneers (2007–15, to Greater Cleveland Conference)
Garfield Heights Bulldogs (2007–15, to Independents)
Hudson Explorers (2007–15, to Suburban League)
 Lakewood Rangers (2007–12, to West Shore Conference)
Mayfield Wildcats (2007–15, to Western Reserve Conference)
Medina Battling Bees (2007–15, to Greater Cleveland Conference)
Macedonia Nordonia Knights (2007–11, to Suburban League)
Parma Normandy Invaders (2007–15, to Great Lakes Conference)
North Royalton Bears (2007–15, to Suburban League)
Parma Redmen (2007–15, to Great Lakes Conference)
Solon Comets (2007–15, to Greater Cleveland Conference)
Stow-Munroe Falls Bulldogs (2007–15, to Suburban League)
Strongsville Mustangs (2007–15, to Greater Cleveland Conference)
Twinsburg Tigers (2007–15, to Suburban League)
Parma Heights Valley Forge Patriots (2007–15, to Great Lakes Conference)
Mentor Cardinals (2011–15, to Greater Cleveland Conference)
Shaker Heights Red Raiders (2012–15, to Greater Cleveland Conference)
 2 teams from this conference (Brush and Mayfield) will join the Western Reserve Conference come the 2015–16 school year

Football divisions

First Version (1970–77)
 Akron Archbishop Hoban Knights
 Barberton Magics
 Cuyahoga Falls Black Tigers
 Akron St. Vincent-St. Mary (St. Vincent prior to 1972) Fighting Irish
 Lorain Southview Saints
 Warren Western Reserve Raiders

Northern Ohio Athletic League
 Amherst Comets (1927–47, to Southwestern Conference)
 Medina Bees (1927–47, to Southwestern Conference)
 New London Wildcats (1927–47, to Firelands League)
 North Ridgeville Rangers (1927-1933, to Lorain County League)
 Vermilion Sailors (1927–47, to Firelands League)
 Wadsworth Grizzlies (1927-1931, to Western Reserve League)
 Wellington Dukes (1927–45, to Southwestern Conference)
 Lorain Clearview Clippers (1938–47, to Southwestern Conference)

Ohio Scholastic League
(1948-1951)

 Alliance Aviators (1948–51
 Mansfield Tygers (1948-1951)
 Massillon Washington Tigers (1948-1951)
 Canton McKinley Bulldogs (1949-1951)
 Toledo Waite Indians (1948-1951)
 Warren Warren G. Harding Panthers (1948-1951)

The football-only league dissolved in May 1952, prior to the 1952 football season.  Distance and low gate receipts were cited as reasons for folding the league.  Toledo Waite representatives also mentioned that having to play conference newcomer Toledo Macomber in the Toledo City League would have made it impossible for them to continue playing in both leagues.

An interest in joining the league was expressed by Hamilton, Middletown, Springfield, and Toledo Libbey in 1949, but those schools ultimately decided the travel was too much for them to consider as well.

Pioneer Conference
(1977–2007)
 Brecksville-Broadview Heights Bees (1977-2005)
 Brunswick Blue Devils (1977-2007)
 Lodi Cloverleaf Colts (1977-1997)
 North Royalton Bears (1977-2007)
 Strongsville Mustangs (1977-2007)
 Wadsworth Grizzlies (1977-1984)
 Berea Braves (1979-2005)
 Middleburg Heights Midpark Meteors (1979-2005)
 Medina Battling Bees (1986-2007)
 North Ridgeville Rangers (1997-2005)
 Elyria Pioneers (2003-2007)
 Parma Normandy Invaders (2003-2007)
 Parma Redmen (2003-2007)
 Parma Heights Valley Forge Patriots (2003-2007)

This conference's growth was the result of major changes due such as population growth/shift, proximity to interstate corridors and the potential for greater natural border rivalries .  The first was the mid/late 1970s where schools located south of the first ring suburbs near or through the I-71 corridor were realizing unprecedented growth.  The conference's six charter members had outgrown their respective leagues.  Berea and Midpark, both in the heart of the I-71 corridor, followed suit in 1979.  During the 1980s Wadsworth, a member with strong athletic programs despite smaller enrollment, left for the Suburban League where opponents along the US-224 and I-76/I-94 corridors made better natural border rivalries.  Cloverleaf followed suit in the late 1990s due to stagnation in its enrollment and its inability to maintain its programs at competitive levels in the PC.  Conversely, Medina, also along the corridor, joined the PC in 1986 because of its unprecedented growth and the greater natural border rivalries among the league's charter members.  The final shift was the early 2000s where first-ring south/west Cleveland suburbs found the charter PC members were now larger, more suitable opponents and closer in proximity; saving some travel among Lake Erie League opponents of years past.  Lorain County schools, Elyria and North Ridgeville, were looking for closer, competitive opponents as an alternative to the continued shrinking of Lorain City and Sandusky schools.  Their proximity to I-80 and I-480 made the jump to the PC more viable.  This conference was a powerhouse in all sports and it was also the foundation of the Cleveland area's first suburban mega-conference, the NEO Conference, whose format was patterned after similar mega-conferences formed in Columbus, Dayton and Cincinnati suburbs.

Portage County League
One of the longest-surviving county leagues, lasting from 1918 until merging into the Portage Trail Conference in 2005.

 Atwater Spartans (192?-67, consolidated into Waterloo)
 Aurora Greenmen (192?-64, joined Chagrin Valley Conference)
 Brimfield Bears (1918–30, converted to junior high in 1930, consolidated into Field, 1960)
 Charlestown Wildcats (192?-50, consolidated into Southeast)
 Deerfield Bison (192?-50, consolidated into Southeast)
 Edinburgh Scots (192?-50, consolidated into Southeast)
 Freedom Yellowjackets (192?-48, consolidated into Garfield)
 Garrettsville Garfield G-Men (Garrettsville before 1948) (192?-2005, merged into PTC)
 Hiram Huskies (1918–64, consolidated into Crestwood)
 Mantua Hilltoppers, Big Red, then Red Devils (1918–50, consolidated into Mantua-Shalersville)
 Mantua Center Mantua Township Trojans (1918–48, consolidated into Mantua)
 Mogadore Wildcats (192?-57, 1968–2005, merged into PTC)
 Nelson Pirates (192?-48, consolidated into Garfield)
 Palmyra Southeast Pirates (1950–58, 1961–2005, merged into PTC)
 Palmyra (1918–50, consolidated into Southeast)
 Wayland Paris Nightriders (192?-50, consolidated into Southeast)
 Randolph Tigers (192?-67, consolidated into Waterloo)
 Ravenna Township Bulldogs (1918–60, consolidated into Ravenna)
 Rootstown Rovers (192?-2005, merged into PTC)
 Shalersville Rams, also Owls (192?-50, consolidated into Mantua-Shalersville)
 Streetsboro Rockets (192?-1950; 1963–2005, merged into PTC)
 Suffield Big Red, also Red Devils or Red Riders (192?-61, consolidated into Field)
 Windham Bombers (Yellow Jackets before 1939) (192?-53, 1961–2005, merged into PTC)
 Mantua Crestwood Red Devils (Mantua-Shalersville until 1955) (1950–58, 1961–2005, merged into PTC)
 Kent State Statesmen (1960–72, Blue Devils before 1956, school closed)
 Brimfield Field Falcons (Big Red until 1980s) (1961–76, 1990–2005, merged into PTC)
 Atwater Waterloo Vikings (1967-2005, merged into PTC)
 Peninsula Woodridge Bulldogs (1978-2005, merged into PTC)

Premier Athletic Conference
 Chardon Hilltoppers (1998-2015, to Western Reserve Conference)
 Ashtabula Lakeside Dragons (2007–15, to All-American Conference)
 Geneva Eagles (2009–15, to Chagrin Valley Conference)
 Madison Blue Streaks (1998-2015, to Western Reserve Conference)
 Eastlake North Rangers (1998-2015, to Western Reserve Conference)
 Painesville Riverside Beavers (1998-2015, to Western Reserve Conference)
 Willoughby South Rebels (1998-2015, to Western Reserve Conference)
 Hunting Valley University Preppers (2009–15, to Independents)

Section One League
Originally the Stark County B League, this league ended in 1960, as its last remaining member moved to the Stark County AA League.

 Beach City Pirates (1921–60, consolidated into Fairless)
 Brewster Railroaders (1921–60, consolidated into Fairless)
 Canal Fulton Indians (1921–52, consolidated into Northwest)
 East Sparta Spartans (1921–53, consolidated into Sandy Valley)
 Greentown Greyhounds (1921–53, consolidated into North Canton)
 Hartville Blue Streaks (1921–58, consolidated into Lake)
 Lexington Lions (1921–57, consolidated into Marlington)
 Magnolia Panthers (1921–53, consolidated into Sandy Valley)
 Marlboro Dukes (1921–57, consolidated into Marlington)
 Navarre Rams (1921–60, consolidated into Fairless)
 Uniontown Bobcats (1921–58, consolidated into Lake)
 Washington Warriors (1921–57, consolidated into Marlington)
 Waynesburg Mohawks (1921–53, consolidated into Sandy Valley)
 Canton Oakwood Golden Raiders (1933–60, to Stark County AA League)

Senate League
Originally the Stark County A League when formed in 1921, the league adjusted its name when Ohio went from "A"/"B" classification to "AA"/"A" in 1957. When the Federal League split off in 1964, the remaining members renamed their league the SL in response. The League folded in 1989, as its remaining members split to help form two new leagues.

 Alliance Aviators (1921–53, to Big 8 Conference)
 Canton South Wildcats (1921–64, to Federal League)
 East Canton Hornets (1921–79, to PAC-7 1989)
 Canton Glenwood Eagles (Middlebranch until 1957, 1921–64, to Federal League)
 North Canton Hoover Vikings (North Canton until 1957, 1921–68, to Federal League)
 Canton Jackson Polar Bears (1921–64, to Federal League)
 Louisville Leopards (1921–32, to Tri-County League)
 Minerva Lions (1921–32, to Tri-County League; 1973–89, to Northeastern Buckeye Conference)
 Canal Fulton Northwest Indians (1952–77, to All-Ohio League)
 Magnolia Sandy Valley Cardinals (1953–64, to Federal League; 1968–89, to PAC-7)
 Massilon Perry Panthers (1956–64, to Federal League)
 Marlboro Marlington Dukes (1957–64, to Federal League)
 Uniontown Lake Blue Streaks (1958–87, to Federal League)
 Navarre Fairless Falcons (1960–64, to Federal League)
 Canton Oakwood Golden Raiders (1960–68, to Federal League)
 Tuscarawas Township Tuslaw Mustangs (1960–89, to PAC-7)
 Starsburg-Franklin Tigers (1968–71, to Inter-Valley Conference)
 Zoarville Tuscarawas Valley Trojans (1968–74, to Inter-Valley Conference 1974–1977, to All-Ohio Conference  1977–1983; 1983–89 to PAC-7)
 Carrollton Warriors (1974–89, to Northeastern Buckeye Conference)
 Uhrichsville Claymont Mustangs (1974–89, to East Central Ohio League)
 Dover Tornadoes (1987–89, to Northeastern Buckeye Conference)

Tomahawk Conference (Northeast) 
Formed in 1958 by teams in Portage County, some of which had either been excluded from the Portage County League or grown too large due to consolidation. In 1961, it merged with the Portage County League. It remains the smallest athletic conference in the history of Ohio sports.

 Mantua Crestwood Red Devils (1958–1961)
 Palmyra Southeast Pirates (1958–1961)
 Ravenna  Ravens (1958–1961, except football)
 Windham Bombers (1958–1961)

Tri-County League (Northeast) 
Formed in 1932, this league (along with the Inter-County League) merged to form the Inter-Tri County League in 2006.

 Boardman Spartans (1932–51)
 Columbiana Clippers (1932–51, 1956–76, 1991–2006)
 Lisbon David Anderson Blue Devils (1932-, 2006)
 East Palestine Bulldogs (1932–76, 1990–2006)
 Leetonia Bears (1932–35, 1950–2006)
 Louisville Leopards (1932–66)
 Sebring McKinley Trojans (1932-2005)
 Minerva Lions (1932–73)
 Poland Poland Seminary Bulldogs (1951–72)
 Bergholz Springfield Local Flying Tigers (1972–88, consolidated into Edison South)
 Hanoverton United Golden Eagles (1972-2006)
 Lisbon Beaver Local Beavers (1974–76)
 Salineville Southern Local Indians (1974-2006)
 Hammondsville Stanton Red Raiders (1974–88, re-branded as Edison North)
 Toronto Red Knights (1974–76)
 Wellsville Tigers (1974–76, 2005–06)
Columbiana Crestview Rebels (1975-2006)

Football Divisions 1974 & 1975 seasons:

Trolley League 
Bedford Bearcats
Cuyahoga Falls Black Tigers
Akron Kenmore Cardinals
Kent Roosevelt Rough Riders
Kent State University School Blue Devils
Ravenna Ravens

West Shore Conference

 Avon Eagles (2005-2015, to Southwestern Conference)
 Bay Village Bay Rockets (2005-2015, to Great Lakes Conference)
 Fairview Park Fairview Warriors (2005-2011, to Patriot Athletic Conference)
 Oberlin Firelands Falcons (2005-2011, to Patriot Athletic Conference)
 Grafton Midview Middies (2005-2015, to Southwestern Conference)
 North Ridgeville Rangers (2005-2015, to Southwestern Conference)
 Rocky River Pirates (2005-2015, to Great Lakes Conference)
 Vermilion Sailors (2005-2015, to Sandusky Bay 2016)
 Elyria Catholic Panthers (2011-2015, to Great Lakes Conference)
 Lakewood Rangers (2012-2015, to Southwestern Conference)

Youngstown City Series

 Youngstown East Golden Bears (1925–98, school closed)
 Youngstown North Bulldogs (1925–80, school closed)
 Youngstown Rayen Tigers (1925-2003, to Steel Valley)
 Youngstown South Warriors (1925–93, school closed)
 Youngstown Wilson Presidents (until 1958)/Redmen (1936-2003, to Steel Valley)
 Youngstown Cardinal Mooney Cardinals (1958–70, to Steel Valley)
 Youngstown Ursuline Fighting Irish (1958–70, to Steel Valley)
 Youngstown Chaney Cowboys (1960-2003, to Steel Valley)
 Canton Timken Trojans (1999-2003, to PAC-8 2005)

See also
Ohio High School Athletic Association
Ohio High School Athletic Conferences
OHSAA Northeast Region athletic conferences

Notes and references